Town ward is a ward in the metropolitan borough of Doncaster, South Yorkshire, England.  The ward contains 105 listed buildings that are recorded in the National Heritage List for England.  Of these, two are listed at Grade I, the highest of the three grades, two are at Grade II*, the middle grade, and the others are at Grade II, the lowest grade.  The ward contains the central part of the town of Doncaster.  Most of the listed buildings in the ward are houses and associated structures, shops, offices, hotels and public houses, commercial buildings, market buildings, and public buildings.  The town has an important railway history, and buildings associated with this, including some in Doncaster Works and Doncaster railway station are listed.  The other listed buildings include a lock on the River Don Navigation, churches and associated structures, a former theatre, a war memorial, and a former swimming pool and health club.


Key

Buildings

References

Citations

Sources

]

 

Lists of listed buildings in South Yorkshire